Spaneika or Spanaiika (Greek: Σπαναίικα) may refer to several places in Greece:

Spaneika, Achaea, a settlement in the municipal unit Movri, Achaea
Spaneika, Arcadia, a settlement in Arcadia 
Spaneika, Argolis, a settlement in the municipal unit Lyrkeia, Argolis